Boukadir is a town and commune in Chlef Province, Algeria. According to the 1998 census it has a population of 41,655.

The town of Boukadir extends 225 km ² of flat semi arid forest.
It has 95% Electrification and 33% Natural Gases.

References

External links

Communes of Chlef Province
Chlef Province